Al-Būṣīrī (1212–1294) was a Sanhaji Berber Muslim poet belonging to the Shadhiliyya order, being direct disciple of Sheikh Abul Abbas al-Mursi. His magnum opus, the Qaṣīda al-Burda ("Poem of the Mantle"), in praise of the Islamic prophet Muhammad, is one of the most popular Islamic poems praising the prophet, and it is in Arabic language, as much as his other ode named Al-Hamziyya.

Biography 
He was born in Dalāṣ, a small town in Beni Suef Governorate in Egypt (despite the similar name, this town is not to be confused with Dellys, in Algeria), and wrote under the patronage of Ibn Hinna, the vizier. His father was from Abusir, hence his nisba Al-Būṣīrī. Sometimes he also used his nisbe Dalāṣīrī as his mother belonged to the town of Dalāṣ.

In his Qaṣīda al-Burda, he claims that Muhammad cured him of paralysis by appearing to him in a dream and wrapping him in a mantle. The poem has had a unique history (cf. I. Goldziher in Revue de l'histoire des religions, vol. xxxi.  pp. 304 ff.). It has been frequently edited and made the basis for other poems, and new poems have been made by interpolating four or six lines after each line of the original. It has been published with English translation by Faizullabhai (Bombay, 1893), with French translation by René Basset (Paris, 1894), with German translation by C. A. Ralfs (Vienna, 1860), and in other languages elsewhere.

References

Further reading
For a long list of commentaries, etc., cf. C. Brockelmann's Gesch. der Arab. Litteratur (Weimar, 1898), vol. i. pp. 264–267
 La Burda du désert, T. Ikbal, F. Tidjani, M. Vâlsan, Science sacrée, 2015

13th-century Berber people
13th-century Arabic poets
13th-century Egyptian people
Berber Muslims
Sunni Sufis 
Sufi writers 
Berber poets 
Sanhaja